Boubou Cissé (born 1974) is a Malian politician who was the Prime Minister of Mali from April 2019 to his resignation following the 2020 Malian coup d'état in August 2020. He was also the Minister of Economy and Finance and Minister of Mines and Industry.

Early life
Boubou Cissé a Fulani tribe earned a master's degree from the University of Auvergne and a PhD in economics from Aix-Marseille University.

Career
Cissé began his career as an economist for the World Bank in Washington, D.C., US in 2005. In 2008, he was promoted to Senior Economist of its Human Development Division. He later worked in Nigeria and Niger as a resident representative for the World Bank.

Cissé was appointed the Malian Prime Minister in 2019 after the resignation of Soumeylou Boubèye Maïga and his government. He was Minister of Industry and Mines in 2013, the Minister of Mines in April 2014, and the Minister of Economy and Finance since 2016.

On 18 August 2020, Cissé along with the President Ibrahim Boubacar Keïta was detained by mutinying forces during the 2020 Malian coup d'état. The next day, with President Keita's dismissal of Parliament and the government, Cissé was removed from office.

On 1 January 2021, Cissé′s half-brother Aguibou Tall and five others were arrested for an “attempted coup”. Boubou Cissé was also accused, but he was not arrested because the government could not ascertain his whereabouts.

Other activities
 International Monetary Fund (IMF), Ex-Officio Member of the Board of Governors (since 2016)
 Islamic Development Bank, Ex-Officio Member of the Board of Governors (since 2016)
 World Bank, Ex-Officio Member of the Board of Governors (since 2016)

References

Living people
1974 births
People from Bamako
Aix-Marseille University alumni
Malian economists
World Bank people
Prime Ministers of Mali
Finance ministers of Mali
Government ministers of Mali
Malian officials of the United Nations
Commanders of the National Order of Mali
21st-century Malian people